Dean Fedorchuk (born July 28, 1970, in Winnipeg, Manitoba) is a Canadian professional ice hockey coach and former professional ice hockey centre.

Playing career 
After playing for the Winnipeg South Blues in the MJHL, Fedorchuk enrolled at the University of Alaska-Fairbanks in 1990. During his four-year career with the Nanooks, he served as a team captain his sophomore, junior and senior season. He left school in 1994 as the leading goal scorer in program's history and second all-time in career points. Fedorchuk played a total of 144 games for Alaska-Fairbanks, tallying 113 goals and 102 assists. He was named to the All-America First Team his senior year. In 2014, he was inducted into the Nanook Hall of Fame.

He turned pro in 1994 and would spend most of his professional in Europe. The 1994–95 season saw him skate for the Kalamazoo Wings of the IHL and the Dayton Bombers of the ECHL. In 1995, Fedorchuk embarked on a five-year stint with German second-division team EHC Neuwied, where he continued his scoring prowess. In 95-96 and 97–98, he led the league in goals scored, while guiding Neuwied to back-to-back championship titles in 96 and 97. For his efforts, he received 2. Bundesliga Player of the Year honors following the 95-96 campaign. Statistically his best season in Germany came in 1996–97, when he tallied 47 goals and 49 assists in 56 games.

After stints with two other German second-division teams, Heilbronner EC and SC Bietingheim-Bissingen, Fedorchuk took his game to Denmark in 2001. He spent five years with SønderjyskE Ishockey and another two with the Odense Bulldogs. Fedorchuk led the Danish league in goal scoring in the 2002–03 and 2006–07 season and was named MVP of the 2006 playoffs, en route to the Danish championship with SønderjyskE. He called it a career after the 2007–08 season.

Career statistics

Coaching career 
After retiring as a player, Fedorchuk was immediately named head coach of the Odense Bulldogs of the Danish top-flight. He led the Bulldogs to a Danish Cup title as a first-year head coach. In January 2010, Fedorchuk was removed from the head coaching position after a run of bad results.

He then was supposed to serve as head coach of the Kassel Huskies in Germany, but the team folded before the start of the 2010–11 season. In January 2011, Fedorchuk took over head coaching duties at Straubing Tigers of the German elite league Deutsche Eishockey Liga (DEL) for the remainder of the season, replacing Jürgen Rumrich who had been sacked.

From 2011 to 2013, he worked for the Winnipeg Jets of the National Hockey League (NHL) as a scout. In June 2013, Fedorchuk was named assistant coach of KHL Medveščak Zagreb of the Kontinental Hockey League (KHL). He remained in that job until the end of the 2014–15 season.

In June 2017, he was named assistant coach to Mark French at HC Fribourg-Gottéron in the Swiss top flight National League.

References

External links 
 
 

1970 births
Living people
Alaska Nanooks men's ice hockey players
SC Bietigheim-Bissingen players
Canadian ice hockey coaches
Dayton Bombers players
EHC Neuwied players
Heilbronner EC players
Kalamazoo Wings (1974–2000) players
Odense Bulldogs players
SønderjyskE Ishockey players
Ice hockey people from Winnipeg
University of Alaska Fairbanks alumni
Winnipeg South Blues players
Canadian ice hockey centres
AHCA Division I men's ice hockey All-Americans